Walter J. Domach (May 25, 1909 in Milwaukee, Wisconsin – ?) He attended St. John's Cathedral High School and Spencerian Business College., was a member of the Wisconsin State Assembly.

Career
Domach was a member of the Assembly from 1939 to 1940. Previously, he was a member of the Democratic National Committee from 1936 to 1938.

References

Politicians from Milwaukee
Detroit Business Institute alumni
1909 births
Year of death missing
Place of death missing
Democratic Party members of the Wisconsin State Assembly